Guild Esports PLC (previously The Lords Esports) is a United Kingdom-based professional esports company founded in 2019. The company is co-owned by former professional football player David Beckham and launched globally in June 2020. Guild Esports was the first esports firm to be publicly traded in the United Kingdom. The organisation has competitive teams in Apex Legends, FIFA, Fortnite, Rocket League, and Valorant.

History
The Guild Esports was founded in September 2019 under the name The Lords Esports. In June 2020, The Lords Esports raised an additional million (M) in private funding, with former professional football player David Beckham acquiring a "significant minority stake" in the company, and rebranded to Guild Esports. The company made its shares available through its initial public offering (IPO) on the London Stock Exchange (LSE) in September 2020, making Guild Esports the first publicly traded esports organization on the LSE, and raised million (M) through the IPO. In September 2021, it was announced that Guild had become main shirt sponsors of League of Ireland Premier Division club Finn Harps, meaning the brand would also feature in FIFA 22 on the club's shirts.

In January 2022, Guild Esports signed a 10-year lease for a  facility in London. The facility will act as the organization's headquarters and training facility and is expected to open in Q2.

Esports
In November 2020, Guild Esports created their Fortnite division. In March 2021, the team won the Fortnite Champion Series European Grand Finals. The next month, the organisation's Rocket League team won the Rocket League Championship Series EU Spring Regional.

Rosters

References

Esports teams based in the United Kingdom
2019 establishments in the United Kingdom
Esports teams established in 2019
Apex Legends teams
FIFA (video game series) teams
Fortnite teams
Rocket League teams
Valorant teams